Vladislav Kuzhal (born 12 February 1998) is a Belarusian former professional footballer.

Honours
Dinamo Brest
Belarusian Cup winner: 2016–17

References

External links 
 
 
 Profile at FC Minsk website

1998 births
Living people
Belarusian footballers
Association football goalkeepers
FC Minsk players
FC Dynamo Brest players
FC Energetik-BGU Minsk players